Licence to Funk is a 2007 jazz / funk album by Nils Landgren.

Track listing
"House Party" 5:05 (Fred Wesley)
"Freak U" 4:34 (Magnum Coltrane Price)
"24 Hours" 4:30 (Nils Landgren)
"Stuff Like That" 5:39 (Quincy Jones, Nick Ashford, Valerie Simpson)
"Slowfoot" 5:49 (Wolfgang Haffner)
"Capetown Shuffle" 5:51 (Min Nils Landgren)
"Secret" 4:39 (Wolfgang Haffner, Magnum Coltrane Price)
"Samplerayt" 5:40 (Ida Sandlund)
"For Those Who Like to Party" 4:25 (Ida Sandlund)
"At Home" 5:21 (Ray Parker Jr.)
"Tomomis Tune" 6:57 (Stix Hooper)
"Brazos River Breakdown" 5:10 (Magnum Coltrane Price)

Performers
Magnus Lindgren - vocals / tenor saxophone / flute
Ray Parker Jr. - guitar
Nils Landgren - trombone
Ida Sandlund - keyboards
Magnum Coltrane Price - bass guitar
Wolfgang Haffner - drums

References

2007 albums
Nils Landgren (musician) albums